Azimabad (also Romanized as ʿAẓīmābād; also known as Tītīābād (Persian: تي تي اباد) and A‘z̧amābād) is a village in Sanjabad-e Jonubi Rural District, Firuz District, Kowsar County, Ardabil Province, Iran. At the 2006 census, its population was 23, in 7 families.

References 

Towns and villages in Kowsar County